Siø is a small Danish island in the South Funen Archipelago between Tåsinge and Langeland. It is part of Langeland Municipality. With an area of 1.3 km2, as of 1 January 2014 it has a population of 16. Since 1681, a system of dykes has expanded it to include the former islands of Skovø and Store Fugleø. In 1959, it was connected to Tåsinge by a causeway and a low bridge and, in 1962, to Langeland by a bridge. Today the island is used mainly for pig farming.

See also
 List of islands of Denmark
 Langeland Municipality

References

Islands of Denmark
Geography of Langeland Municipality